The 2004 Cincinnati Reds season was the 135th season for the franchise in Major League Baseball, and their second season at Great American Ball Park in Cincinnati. They improved on their 69–93 record from 2003 but missed the playoffs for the 10th consecutive season.

Offseason
January 14, 2004: John Vander Wal was signed as a free agent with the Cincinnati Reds.
March 14, 2004: John Vander Wal was released by the Cincinnati Reds.
March 17, 2004: John Vander Wal was signed as a free agent with the Cincinnati Reds.

Regular season

Season summary
The Reds finished with a final record of 76–86.  That earned them fourth place in their division. They finished 29 games behind the division winner and eventual National League champion, the St. Louis Cardinals.  The Reds also finished 16 games behind the second place team and National League wild card winner, the Houston Astros.  The Reds finished 13 games behind the third place team, the Chicago Cubs. They finished 3½ games ahead of the fifth place team, the Pittsburgh Pirates, and 8½ games ahead of the sixth place team, the Milwaukee Brewers.

Season standings

National League Central

Record vs. opponents

Notable transactions
April 6, 2004: Kenny Kelly was signed as a free agent with the Cincinnati Reds.

Roster

Player stats

Batting

Starters by position 
Note: Pos = Position; G = Games played; AB = At bats; H = Hits; Avg. = Batting average; HR = Home runs; RBI = Runs batted in

Other batters 
Note: G = Games played; AB = At bats; H = Hits; Avg. = Batting average; HR = Home runs; RBI = Runs batted in

Pitching

Starting pitchers 
Note: G = Games pitched; IP = Innings pitched; W = Wins; L = Losses; ERA = Earned run average; SO = Strikeouts

Other pitchers 
Note: G = Games pitched; IP = Innings pitched; W = Wins; L = Losses; ERA = Earned run average; SO = Strikeouts

Relief pitchers 
Note: G = Games pitched; W = Wins; L = Losses; SV = Saves; ERA = Earned run average; SO = Strikeouts

Farm system

References

Season standings: National League Central Standings on ESPN.com
Batting Statistics: Cincinnati Reds Batting Stats on ESPN.com
Pitching Statistics: Cincinnati Reds Pitching Stats on ESPN.com

2004 Cincinnati Reds statistics at Baseball Reference.com

Cincinnati Reds seasons
Cincinnati Reds season
Cinc